The 2020 Temple Owls football team represented Temple University during the 2020 NCAA Division I FBS football season. The Owls were led by second-year head coach Rod Carey and played their home games at Lincoln Financial Field, competing as a member of the American Athletic Conference (AAC).

Schedule
Temple had games scheduled against Miami, Rutgers, UMass and Idaho which were canceled due to the COVID-19 pandemic.

The game between Temple and Cincinnati, scheduled for November 28, was canceled due to COVID-19 outbreaks at both schools. The game will not be rescheduled, be declared a no contest and both teams will have a bye.

Schedule Source:

Game summaries

at Navy

South Florida

at Memphis

at Tulane

SMU

at UCF

East Carolina

References

Temple
Temple Owls football seasons
Temple Owls football